Svetlana Alexandrovna Krivonogikh (born 10 March 1975) is a Russian millionaire.

Biography
Krivonogikh was born in Leningrad, Russian SFSR (now Saint Petersburg, Russia), on 10 March 1975. 

She attended Saint Petersburg State University of Economics and Finance in the Department of International Economic Relations, receiving her diploma in 2000.
 
Krivonogikh has a daughter, Elizaveta (also known as Luiza Rozova), born in March 2003. An investigation by Proekt Media published in November 2020 alleged that Elizaveta's father is Russian president Vladimir Putin.

Krivonogikh's name became known with the 2020 Proekt investigation, which documented her connection to Putin as well as her financial assets and properties in Russia. Her name became more widely known in connection with the Pandora Papers published by ICIJ in October 2021, which revealed her assets overseas.

Sanctions

References

1975 births
Living people
Russian women in business
Family of Vladimir Putin
Russian individuals subject to United Kingdom sanctions